Mielęcin may refer to the following places in Poland:
Mielęcin, Lower Silesian Voivodeship (south-west Poland)
Mielęcin, Choszczno County in West Pomeranian Voivodeship (north-west Poland)
Mielęcin, Pyrzyce County in West Pomeranian Voivodeship (north-west Poland)
Mielęcin, Wałcz County in West Pomeranian Voivodeship (north-west Poland)